Tomicus is a genus of beetles belonging to the family Curculionidae.

The genus was described in 1802 by Pierre André Latreille.

The genus has cosmopolitan distribution.

Species:
 Tomicus piniperda (Linnaeus, 1758)

References

Scolytinae
Curculionidae genera